Deepak Bhaskar Shetty (born 28 August 1991) is an Indian cricketer. He made his first-class debut on 25 December 2019, for Mumbai in the 2019–20 Ranji Trophy.

References

External links
 

1991 births
Living people
Indian cricketers
Mumbai cricketers
Place of birth missing (living people)